is a district located in Kagoshima Prefecture, Japan. The current population is 11,420.

Towns 
The district has one town:

Yūsui

History
April 1, 1889 - Due to the municipal status enforcement, the villages of Chōsa, Kajiki, Gamo, Mizobe, Shigetomi and Yamada were created within Aira District. (6 villages)
April 1, 1897 – Aira District merges with Nishisoo (the villages of Fukuyama, Kokubu, Nishikokubu, Higashikokubu, Shikine, Shimizu, and Higashi襲山村) and Kuwahara Districts (the villages of Kurino, Yoshimatsu, Makizono, Yokogawa, Nishi襲山村). (18 villages)
June 1, 1912 – The villages of Kajiki gained town status. (1 town, 17 villages)
April 1, 1926 – The village of Kokubu gained town status. (2 towns, 16 villages)
November 1, 1928 – The village of Kamou gained town status. (3 towns, 15 villages)
October 10, 1929 – The village of Nishikokubu gained town status and renamed to become the town of Hayato. (4 towns, 14 villages)
November 1, 1929 – The village of Fukuyama gained town status. (5 towns, 13 villages)
November 1, 1930 – The village of 西襲山村 renamed the village of Hinatayama. 
April 1, 1932 – The village of Kurino gained town status. (6 towns, 12 villages)
July 10, 1935 – The village of 東襲山村 renamed the village of Kirishima.
February 16, 1940 – The town of Yokogawa gained town status. (7 towns, 11 villages)
April 1, 1940 – The village of Makizono gained town status. (8 towns, 10 villages)
April 1, 1942 – The village of Chōsa gained town status. (9 towns, 9 villages)
April 1, 1950 – The village of 東襲山村 separated from the village of Kirishima. (9 towns, 10 villages) 
February 11, 1953 – The village of Yoshimatsu gained town status. (10 towns, 9 villages)
May 3, 1953 – The village of Hinatayama gained town status. (11 towns, 8 villages)
April 1, 1954 (10 towns, 6 villages)
The town of Kokubu and the villages of 東襲山村 and a part of Shimizu merged to form the town of Kokubu.
The town of Hayato and Hinatayama, and the remaining parts of village of Shimizu merged to form the town of Hayatohinatayama. 
May 10, 1954 - the town of Kokubu, and the villages of Higashikokubu and Shikine merged to form the town of Kokubu. (10 towns, 4 villages)
January 1, 1955(10 towns, 2 villages)
The town of Chōsa, the village of Shigetomi, and parts of the village of Yamada merged to form the town of Aira.
The remaining parts of the village of Yamada merged into the town of Kamō.
February 1, 1955 – The town of Kokubu gained city status.(9 towns, 2 villages)
April 1, 1957 – The town of Hayatohinatayama changed their name to the town of Hayato.
November 3, 1958 – The village of Kirishima gained town status.(10 towns, 1 village)
April 1, 1959 – The village of Mizobe gained town status.(11 towns)
March 22, 2005 – The towns of Kurino and Yoshimatsu merged to form the town of Yūsui.(10 towns)
November 7, 2005 – The towns of Hayato, Fukuyama, Kirishima, Mizobe, Yokogawa, and Makizono merged with the city of Kokubu to form the city of Kirishima (4 towns)
March 23, 2010 – The Aira District towns of Aira, Kajiki, and Kamō merged to form the city of Aira. Aira District is left with one municipality.

References

Districts in Kagoshima Prefecture